"F.S.O." (abbreviation of Fuck Shit Off) is a song by Australian rock band Regurgitator. The song was released in February 1996 as the band's first commercially released single and first single from the band's debut studio album Tu-Plang. The single peaked at number 51 in Australia.

Ben Ely said, "Quan wrote this about his sister-in-law and how she got married to this guy who turned out to be a brute and was violent with her. This song is his anger at the situation. I love how it sounds like an angry song, though it's a song about not tolerating someone else's anger."

Quan Yeomans said, "I was never particularly thrilled with my vocals on this one, but it has a punk urgency and ugliness about it that is apt for the idea behind it."

Track listings

Charts

Release history

References

 

1996 singles
1995 songs
Regurgitator songs
Songs written by Quan Yeomans
Song recordings produced by Magoo (Australian producer)
Warner Music Australasia singles